Héctor Becerra (born May 10, 1965) is a Mexican football manager and former player.

References

External links
 

1965 births
Living people
Footballers from Nuevo León
Sportspeople from Monterrey
Association football wingers
Mexico international footballers
C.F. Monterrey players
Correcaminos UAT footballers
Liga MX players
Mexican football managers
Liga MX Femenil managers
Mexican footballers